The Peter Norbeck Summer House, in Custer State Park near Custer, South Dakota, was built in 1927.  It was listed on the National Register of Historic Places in 1977.  It has also been known as Valhalla.

It is a large one-and-a-half-story log house with saddle-notched corners.

It was deemed significant for its architecture and for its association with Peter Norbeck (1870-1936), a Progressive politician and two-term governor of South Dakota.

References

External links

Log buildings and structures on the National Register of Historic Places in South Dakota
National Register of Historic Places in Custer County, South Dakota
Houses completed in 1927